Aureliano Milani (1675–1749) was an Italian painter of the late-Baroque period, active in Bologna and Rome.

He was a pupil of Cesare Gennari and Lorenzo Pasinelli in Bologna, although he also adhered to a style derived from the Carracci.  He took up his residence in Rome, being ill able to support a family of ten children at Bologna. He painted a Beheaded St. John the Baptist for  the church of the Bergamaschi in Rome. In Rome, he abounded with commissions, and was promoted with Domenico Maria Muratori and Donato Creti. Aureliano also taught during many years at Bologna, and among other pupils of his were Giuseppe Marchesi (called il Sansone) and Antonio Gionima.

References

External links

1675 births
1749 deaths
17th-century Italian painters
Italian male painters
18th-century Italian painters
Painters from Bologna
Italian Baroque painters
18th-century Italian male artists